John Harding may refer to:

People
John Harding (Leicester MP) British politician, represented Leicester (UK Parliament constituency)
John Harding (President of Magdalen) (died 1610), English churchman and academic
Sir John Harding (1809-1868), Queens Advocate 
John Harding (Southern planter) (1777–1865), American Southern planter and thoroughbred breeder
John Harding (cricketer) (fl. 1809), English cricketer
John Harding (bishop) (1805–1874), bishop of Bombay
J. Eugene Harding (1877–1959), U.S. Representative from Ohio
John Harding, 1st Baron Harding of Petherton (1896–1989), British WWII General, Colonial Governor of Cyprus
John Harding, 2nd Baron Harding of Petherton (1928–2016), British army officer
John L. Harding (1780–1837), American mayor of Frederick, Maryland
Jack Harding (1898–1963), American coach of American football
J. P. Harding (1911–1998), British zoologist
John Harding (footballer) (1932–1994), Australian rules footballer
John Harding (photographer) (born 1940), American photographer
John Tisdale Harding (born c. 1945), American on-air radio personality and news director
John Harding (violinist) (born 1950), Australian violinist
John Harding (author) (1951–2017), British novelist
John Wesley Harding (singer) (born 1965), English singer
 John Harding (playwright) (fl. 1990s– ), Australian playwright, co-founder and board member of the First Nations Australia Writers Network
John Harding (Sha ko hen the tha) (fl. 2000s), Mohawk leader and politician from Quebec, Canada

Music
John Wesley Harding, a 1967 album by Bob Dylan named after John Wesley Hardin
"John Wesley Harding" (song)

See also
John Hardin (disambiguation)
John Hardyng (1378–1465), English chronicler
John Wesley Hardin (1853–1895), American gun-fighter

Harding, John